Troy Resources is an Australian mining corporation. It is publicly listed on the Australian Securities Exchange.

History
The corporation was established in 1984. It has been listed on the Australian Stock Exchange since 1987. It started production and shortly after exploration in Southern Cross, Western Australia.

It operates a mine in Andorinhas in Para State, Brazil and Casposo in San Juan Province, Argentina. Additionally, it has a project in Guyana.

On 12 July 2013 it acquired Azimuth Resources.

It operates the Sandstone Gold Mine in Sandstone, Western Australia. Ref?

References

Companies listed on the Australian Securities Exchange
Companies established in 1984
1984 establishments in Australia
Mining companies of Australia